Methylocapsa aurea is a Gram-negative, aerobic, non-motile bacteria from the genus of Methylocapsa which was isolated from forest soil in Germany. It is a facultative methanotroph.

References

External links
Type strain of Methylocapsa aurea at BacDive -  the Bacterial Diversity Metadatabase

Beijerinckiaceae
Bacteria described in 2010